The Illinois Department of Innovation and Technology is the code department of the Illinois state government that operates the data processing, information technology, and telecommunications operations of the state.  The department was created by executive order of former Gov Bruce Rauner in July 2016, and its existence and operations were made official by statuory law in July 2018.

References

Innovation and Technology